"Monster" is a song by Canadian singers Shawn Mendes and Justin Bieber. It was released through  Island Records as the second single from the former's fourth studio album, Wonder, on November 20, 2020. The song was produced by Frank Dukes and additionally produced by Matthew Tavares and Kaan Güneşberk. The two artists wrote it with Dukes alongside Daniel Caesar and Mustafa the Poet. All producers and songwriters are Canadian.

Background
Rumours about a possible collaboration began in July 2020 after Bieber and Mendes were spotted with American singer-songwriter Tori Kelly, jamming around on a piano, when Bieber's manager, Scooter Braun, posted videos of them. In August 2020, the two artists were spotted with Bieber's wife, American model Hailey Bieber, at American record producer Andrew Watt's recording studio in Los Angeles, California, fuelling speculation of an upcoming collaboration between the two Canadian artists. During an interview on Capital Breakfast with Roman Kemp on October 6, 2020, Mendes was asked if he turned down a collaboration with Bieber in September, to which he replied: "Is this you trying to get me to confirm that I have a collaboration with Justin Bieber? I didn't last month". He said that it would be "insane" for him to turn it down, considering that Bieber has been one of his favourite artists since he was nine years old. He stated that he cannot confirm or deny", but added that their relationship in the past six months leading up to the time of the interview has grown closer. "It's really cool to have him as a mentor in a lot of ways, just to kind of talk through stuff with, because there's not many people who do this type of stuff," he furtherly explained, describing Bieber as "freakishly talented". The song marks the first time the two singers have worked together. In an exclusive interview for Apple Music, Mendes told Zane Lowe that the single is "about how society can put celebrities up on a pedestal and watch them fall". Mendes called it "one of the most special songs" he had ever written.

Composition and lyrics
"Monster" is a pop song that is set in the key of D minor with a tempo of 146 beats per minute. Lyrically, the song is about the pitfalls and pressure of stardom. Mendes stated: "It's about how society can put celebrities up on a pedestal and watch them fall and it seems to be this entertainment thing. And it's hard."

Release and promotion
The song was first revealed on September 29, 2020, when Mendes launched an interactive VR experience on a website for the album, in which a "set list" showed a track titled "Monster" with a special guest. On November 13, 2020, Mendes released the official album tracklist, confirming the song's title, while its co-lead artist remains unannounced. On November 16, 2020, Mendes and Bieber both posted a 13-second teaser clip on social media, officially announcing the release date of the collaboration, which serves as the second single from the album after "Wonder". The teaser features a synthy instrumental playing in the background, with the song's title, release date and the two artist's names overlaid on top of four outdoor scenes in dimly lit and foggy conditions, including an empty street with streetlights, a forest, and an empty platform with stairs. On November 18, 2020, Mendes and Bieber posted the song's cover art on social media, as well as pre-order links for the single, which includes limited CD singles with two different exclusive covers available on the singers' respective online stores.

Accolades

Music video
The music video was directed by Colin Tilley and released via YouTube on November 20, 2020. The video is shot in one single take, and starts with Mendes walking through the woods onto a cube platform with stairs and continuing his performance there, before being joined by Bieber. Video director Rory Kramer released several images of the production on Instagram, including one showing a crane on location with a platform that enabled the camera operator to capture the video in a single take. The scenario captures the emotions in the song and what it is about.

Commercial performance
The song debuted and peaked at number eight on the Billboard Hot 100, making it Mendes' sixth top 10 and Bieber’s 21st in the United States. Monster also debuted in the top ten in over fifteen countries, including the UK and Australia. Elsewhere, the song debuted at number one in Denmark and Canada, making it Mendes's second number one single and Bieber's 11th in the latter.

Live performances 
Bieber and Mendes performed the song for the first time at the American Music Awards of 2020 on November 22, 2020.

Credits and personnel
Credits adapted from Tidal.

 Justin Bieber – songwriting
 Shawn Mendes – songwriting
 Frank Dukes – production, songwriting, record engineering
 Kaan Gunesberk – additional production
 Matthew Tavares – additional production
 Daniel Caesar – songwriting
 Mustafa the Poet – songwriting
 Chris Galland – mixing assistance
 Jeremie Inhaber – mixing assistance
 Robin Florent – mix engineering
 Manny Marroquin – mixing
 George Seara – record engineering
 Josh Gudwin – record engineering, vocal production

Charts

Weekly charts

Year-end charts

Certifications

Release history

References

External links
 
 

2020 songs
2020 singles
Canadian Hot 100 number-one singles
Def Jam Recordings singles
Island Records singles
Justin Bieber songs
Music videos directed by Colin Tilley
Number-one singles in Denmark
Shawn Mendes songs
Song recordings produced by Frank Dukes
Songs written by Shawn Mendes
Songs written by Justin Bieber
Songs written by Frank Dukes
Songs written by Daniel Caesar
Male vocal duets
Songs about monsters